Lebesby is a village in Lebesby Municipality in Troms og Finnmark county, Norway. The village is located on the shore of the Laksefjorden, along Norwegian County Road 888. The population was 85 in 2015. Lebesby Church is located in the center of the village.

References

Villages in Finnmark
Lebesby
Populated places of Arctic Norway